Faà di Bruno was an Italian monitor built during World War I. 
Completed in 1917, the ship played a small role in the 11th Battle of the Isonzo later that year. She was decommissioned in 1924, but returned to service as the floating battery GM 194 at the beginning of World War II and was towed to Genoa and where she spent the rest of the war. The ship had her guns disabled when the Royal Navy bombarded Genoa in 1941. GM 194 was captured by the Germans after the Italian Armistice in 1943 and was turned over to the puppet  (Italian Social Republic) that they installed afterward. She was scuttled at the end of the war and subsequently scrapped.

Development and description
Faà di Bruno was built when 40-caliber Cannone navale da 381/40 guns from the s became available after their construction was suspended in 1916. Her guns were built by Ansaldo-Schneider and originally destined for the Cristoforo Colombo. Faà di Bruno was powered by two surplus Thornycroft vertical triple-expansion steam engines from discarded torpedo boats. The ship's navigation bridge was placed on a prominent tripod mast abaft the gun turret. Faà di Brunos crew consisted of 45 officers and enlisted men.

Her Cannone navale da 381/40 guns could elevate +15° and her twin-gun turret could traverse 30° to either side. She was fitted with four 40-caliber  Ansaldo anti-aircraft (AA) guns. The ship also mounted two 39-caliber water-cooled  Vickers-Terni 1915/1917 light AA guns.

Her guns were mounted in an open-topped turret covered by an armored dome.

Service

Faà di Bruno was laid down on 10 October 1915, even before the battleships were officially suspended, by the Venetian Arsenal to a design by Rear Admiral Giuseppe Rota that was essentially that of a self-propelled barge as she lacked a bow. The ship was launched on 30 January 1916 and commissioned on 1 April 1917. Her first action came during the 11th Battle of the Isonzo in August 1917. She was driven ashore in a storm in November, but was not salvaged for almost a full year.

She was stricken from the Navy List on 13 November 1924, but was placed back into service at the beginning of World War II as the floating battery GM 194. She was towed from Venice to Genoa, where she remained for the rest of the war. When the Royal Navy bombarded Genoa on 9 February 1941, she only fired three times at the British ships because one of the first British shells damaged the cables that provided electrical power to her guns. She was captured by the Germans after the Italian armistice and was turned over to the puppet  (National Republican Navy). GM 194 was scuttled in Savona at the end of the war and was subsequently scrapped.

References

Bibliography

External links
 Illustrated description
 Faa di Bruno Marina Militare website

1916 ships
Ships built by Venetian Arsenal
World War I naval ships of Italy
World War II naval ships of Italy
Naval ships of Italy captured by Germany during World War II
World War I monitors
World War II monitors